Christian Abraham Fleetwood (July 21, 1840 – September 28, 1914), was an African American non-commissioned officer in the United States Army, a commissioned officer in the D.C. National Guard, an editor, a musician, and a government official. He received the Medal of Honor for his actions during the American Civil War.

Early life
Fleetwood was born in Baltimore on July 21, 1840, the son of Charles and Anna Maria Fleetwood, both were free persons of color. He received his early education in the home of a wealthy sugar merchant and chairman of Baltimore's chamber of commerce, John C. Brunes, and his wife. The latter treated Fleetwood like her son and taught him to read and write. He continued his education at the Maryland State Colonization Society, went briefly to Liberia and Sierra Leone, and graduated in 1860 from Ashmun Institute (later known as Lincoln University) in Oxford, Pennsylvania. He established and published The Lyceum Observer, said to be the first newspaper in the Upper South to be owned and operated by an African American.

Civil War
When the American Civil War disrupted travel by ship to Liberia, Fleetwood went to Baltimore's Camp Birney and enlisted into Company G of the 4th Regiment United States Colored Infantry, Union Army, on August 11 or August 17, 1863. Due to his educated background, Fleetwood was given the rank of sergeant upon enlistment and was promoted to sergeant major on August 19. His regiment, assigned to the 3rd Division, saw service with the 10th, 18th, and 25th Army Corps in campaigns in North Carolina and Virginia, particularly on July 16, 1864, in the Battle of Petersburg and on September 29–30, 1864, in the Battle of Chaffin's Farm.

On September 29, 1864, the 3rd Division, including Fleetwood's regiment, participated in the Battle of Chaffin's Farm on the outskirts of the Confederate capital of Richmond, Virginia. During the 4th Regiment's charge on the enemy fortifications, Fleetwood supervised the unit's left flank. Among the charging soldiers was Sergeant Alfred B. Hilton, the bearer of two flags, one of which had been seized from a wounded sergeant. When Hilton himself was wounded, Fleetwood and another soldier, Charles Veale, each grabbed a flag from him before the colors could touch the ground. Now carrying the American flag, Fleetwood continued forward under heavy fire until it became clear that the unit could not penetrate the enemy defenses. Retreating back to the reserve line, he used the flag to rally a small group of men and continue the fight. For their actions during the battle, Fleetwood, Hilton, and Veale were each issued the Medal of Honor just over six months later, on April 6, 1865. Fleetwood's official Medal of Honor citation reads simply: "Seized the colors, after 2 color bearers had been shot down, and bore them nobly through the fight." The medal is now part of the collection of the Smithsonian's National Museum of American History. Fleetwood also won a General B. F. Butler Medal, presumably for his action in the same engagement.

Although every officer of the regiment sent a petition for him to be commissioned an officer, Secretary of War Edwin Stanton did not recommend appointment. Fleetwood was honorably discharged from the Army on May 4, 1866. Fleetwood's 1864 service is in part detailed in a diary he wrote that year full of entries about his experiences during the war.

Post-war life
After the war, Fleetwood worked as a bookkeeper in Columbus, Ohio, until 1867, and in several minor government positions in the Freedmen's Bank and War Department in Washington, D.C. With his wife Sara Iredell, whom he married on November 16, 1869, he led an active social life. Sara Iredell's grandmother, Louisa Burr, was the sister of Philadelphia abolitionist John (Jean) Pierre Burr and daughter of U.S. vice president, Aaron Burr. Sara's maternal uncle, novelist Frank J. Webb, lived with the couple in Washington in 1870 while writing for Frederick Douglass' New Era. The Fleetwoods had one daughter, Edith. 
They were well acquainted with most of the prominent African Americans of the period, many who frequently visited their residence. Members of Washington's black elite society presented Fleetwood with a testimonial in 1889.

In January 1881 Fleetwood was elected Captain of the Washington Colored National Guard, better known as Washington Cadets or Washington Cadet Corps (WCC, to not be confused with the Washington High School Cadets, in which Fleetwood later also became involved). At first, the WCC was organized as a single company and commanded by Captain George D. Graham on June 12, 1880, when Fleetwood joined the corps as a commissioned officer. The WCC expanded to a three-, then four-company-battalion and remained an all-black-unit including its commissioned officers. 

On on July 18, 1887, the WCC transformed into the 6th Battailon of the District of Columbia Army National Guard (DCNG). Fleetwood organized that battalion and became its commanding officer with the rank of major. The DCNG amalgamated seven battalions with four of them consisting of white members and three of them being "black", the Butler Zouaves (organized in 1863), the Washington Cadet Corps (1880) and the Capital City Guards (1882). While the Butler Zouaves was disbanded in 1888, the two remaining black battalions were restricted to two companies each and merged into the newly created First Separate Battalion in 1891. When Frederick C. Revells from the Capital City Guards was made the new commander, Fleetwood felt passed over himself and resigned shortly afterwards, in 1892.

Meanwhile, Fleetwood and Major Charles B. Fisher, who had commanded the Fifth Battalion (Butler Zouaves), were instrumental in organizing the Colored High School Cadet Corps of the District of Columbia, in 1888. Also known as the Washington High School Cadets (see above), the corps' first company was recruited at M Street High (later to become Dunbar High School). Fleetwood, the first instructor of the corps , served until 1897, when he was succeeded by Major Arthur Brooks. These two officers developed a tradition of military service among young colored men in Washington which led some of them to enlist in World War I and others to be commissioned at the Colored Officers Training Camp in Fort Des Moines, Iowa.

Fleetwood never returned to active duty with any military organization. However, many residents of the District of Columbia recommended that he be appointed as the Commander of the 50th U.S. Colored Volunteer Infantry during the Spanish–American War. This request was not seriously considered by the War Department, and the participation of colored soldiers from the District of Columbia was similarly disregarded. It is not known whether Fleetwood's short stature and physical ailments reduced his chances for consideration. His army records state that he was five feet, four and one half inches tall. These records also state that he applied in 1891 for a pension which he finally received because of "total" deafness in his left ear, the result of "gunshot concussion," and "severe" deafness in his right ear, the result of catarrh contracted while in the army. The last monthly pension payment was disbursed in September 1914, by then 24 U.S. Dollars. His application also stated that these ailments prevented him from speaking or singing in public.

Before being hampered by his progressing deafness, Fleetwood served for a number of years as choirmaster of the 15th Street Presbyterian Church, St. Luke's and St. Mary's Protestant Episcopal Churches, as well as the Berean Baptist Church. Supported by the community, including the wives of former presidents (Lucy Webb Hayes and Frances Folsom Cleveland), his musical presentations were extremely successful.

Death and legacy
He died suddenly of heart failure in Washington, D.C. on September 28, 1914, at age 74. Funeral services were held at St. Luke's Episcopal Church. Interment was in Columbian Harmony Cemetery, Washington, D.C. The First Separate Battalion of D.C. National Guards served as escort at his funeral. Among the honorary pallbearers were Major Arthur Brooks and such prominent Washingtonians as Daniel Murray, Whitefield McKinlay, and Judge Robert H. Terrell. The participation by the National Guard, and by Arthur Brooks in particular, was an appropriate recognition of the most significant aspects of Fleetwood's career. His remains were moved to National Harmony Memorial Park when Columbia Harmony Cemetery closed in 1959.

Medal of Honor citation
Rank and organization: Sergeant Major, 4th U.S. Colored Troops, Place and date: At Chapin's Farm, Va., September 29, 1864. Entered service at: ------. Birth: Baltimore, Md. Date of issue: April 6, 1865.

His citations reads:

The President of the United States of America, in the name of Congress, takes pleasure in presenting the Medal of Honor to Sergeant Major Christian A. Fleetwood, United States Army, for extraordinary heroism on 29 September 1864, while serving with 4th U.S. Colored Infantry, in action at Chapin's Farm, Virginia. Sergeant Major Fleetwood seized the colors, after two Color Bearers had been shot down, and bore them nobly through the fight.

See also

List of African American Medal of Honor recipients
List of American Civil War Medal of Honor recipients: A–F

Notes

External links

 
 
 
 

1840 births
1914 deaths
Union Army soldiers
United States Army Medal of Honor recipients
Military personnel from Baltimore
People of Maryland in the American Civil War
African Americans in the American Civil War
American Civil War recipients of the Medal of Honor
Burials at Columbian Harmony Cemetery
20th-century African-American people
Lincoln University (Pennsylvania) alumni